Yousuf Ayub Khan (born 1961) is a Pakistani politician who had been disqualified by the supreme court of Pakistan in 2013. He is a grandson of former military dictator and president Ayub Khan..

Yousuf Ayub was born in the village of Rehana in Haripur District of Khyber Pakhtunkhwa, Pakistan. His father was Shoukat Ayub, son of the late Ayub Khan and brother of politician Gohar Ayub Khan. He is a Hindkowan of the Tareen tribe. He was educated at the Army Burn Hall College, Abbottabad, Pakistan, passing high school.

He won several elections in the past and also remained a provincial minister. He was Provincial Minister for Transport during 1988 to 1990 as an independent candidate in Chief Minister Aftab Ahmed Khan Sherpao's cabinet, and after dismissal of government, he again was inducted in the caretaker cabinet of Mir Afzal Khan until the next cabinet took place. He then contested 1993 general elections and won as an independent candidate, but later joined PML N, and was given the portfolio for education ministry, in Chief Minister Pir Sabir Shah's cabinet until his government was replaced. He then remained as Deputy Leader of the Opposition in assembly till 1996. He again won 1997 general elections on PML N ticket, and later was inducted into the new cabinet of then-Chief Minister Sardar Mehtab Abbasi from 21 February 1997 to 12 October 1999, until martial law took place, with 8 to 9 portfolios. He again contested for provincial assembly in the 2002 general elections on PML N ticket but was unsuccessful this time during Musharraf's regime and anti PML N pressure. In 2005 he contested District Nazim election, this time was successful, and was one of 2 PML N candidates who won District Nazim seat despite being strongly opposed by Musharraf's regime, and remained in District Nazim till 2010. After joining PTI in 2011, he contested provincial election on the PTI ticket, and was successful this time, and later was inducted into the provincial cabinet of Pervez Khattak and was given portfolio for C&W, until he was disqualified over a degree issue. Currently his provincial seat is with his brother Akbar Ayub Khan who, after his disqualification, won the by-election and was inducted into Provincial Cabinet with portfolio for C&W until 2018.

Khan has changed parties several times and is currently a member of the Pakistan Tehreek-e-Insaf.

See also
 Raja Sikander Zaman
 Habibullah Khan Tarin
 Omar Ayub Khan

References

Living people
1961 births
People from Haripur District
Army Burn Hall College alumni
Yousuf